Weekend Kitchen with Waitrose is a British lifestyle show that has aired on Channel 4 since 26 April and is hosted by Lisa Snowdon and Steve Jones. Angellica Bell filled in for Snowdon for one episode on 21 June 2014.

Transmissions

External links
Official Website

2014 British television series debuts
2014 British television series endings
British cooking television shows
Channel 4 original programming
English-language television shows
Waitrose